A Ma Wat is a village in  North District, Hong Kong, near Wu Kau Tang and Bride's Pool.

Statutory status
A Ma Wat is a recognised village under the New Territories Small House Policy.

References

External links

 Delineation of area of existing village A Ma Wat (Sha Tau Kok) for election of resident representative (2019 to 2022)

North District, Hong Kong
Villages in North District, Hong Kong